The Lindhurst High School shooting was a school shooting and subsequent siege that occurred on May 1, 1992, at Lindhurst High School in Olivehurst, California, United States. The gunman, 20-year-old Eric Houston, was a former student at Lindhurst High School. Houston killed three students and one teacher and wounded nine students and a teacher before surrendering to police. Houston was sentenced to death for the murders, and he is currently on California's death row in San Quentin State Prison.

Background
Lindhurst High School, where the shooting occurred, has a multiethnic student body, mostly from poor and working-class backgrounds.

Shooting and siege
Houston arrived on campus armed with a 12-gauge pump-action shotgun and a sawed-off .22 caliber rifle around 2:40 p.m. on May 1. As he entered the school, he fatally shot teacher Robert Brens, his civics teacher, during his senior year. He shot and killed Judy Davis, a 17-year-old student in Brens' classroom. Houston then walked through the hallway outside the classroom and fatally shot student Jason Edward White in the chest.
Further on, Houston pointed his shotgun at another student, Angela Welch. Still, before he could fire his weapon, another student, 16-year-old Beamon Aton Hill, pushed her to safety, taking a single fatal bullet to the side of his head. The gunfire injured ten others.

Houston then entered a classroom with about 25 to 30 students inside. According to reports, Houston would send student Andrew Parks to retrieve more hostages, threatening that if he did not come back, he would kill another student and eventually held over 80 students hostage. He engaged in an eight-hour standoff with police before surrendering to authorities.

Aftermath

While in police custody, Houston stated that he was despondent over losing his job and was angered that he failed to graduate from high school or obtain a GED. He claimed to be "out of touch with reality" when he committed the murders. He also confessed to holding a grudge against his former Civics teacher Robert Brens, who failed Houston in his class. On September 21, 1993, Houston was found guilty of all charges against him and was sentenced to death. In 2012, the California Supreme Court upheld his death penalty.  He is currently awaiting execution at San Quentin State Prison.  Eric Houston also stated that he had not warned the school about coming on campus, as some alleged. His statements were introduced as evidence in both the civil and criminal trials. As of 2022, Houston is still on death row.

A memorial park was erected on McGowan Parkway in Olivehurst, California, in remembrance of the four people who died that day.

Film
Detention: The Siege at Johnson High (a.k.a. Hostage High and Target for Rage) is a 1997 film based on the Lindhurst High School shooting. The television series Hostage Do or Die also produced an episode recreating the events of the shooting and standoff. The episode aired on December 29, 2011.

See also
 List of homicides in California

References

External links
The Lindhurst story at Columbine Angels
 Lindhurst High School's website
School shooting turns unwanted attention to Lindhurst high

1992 in California
1992 mass shootings in the United States
1992 murders in the United States
Attacks in the United States in 1992
Crimes in California
Deaths by firearm in California
History of Yuba County, California
Mass murder in California
Mass murder in 1992
May 1992 events in the United States
School massacres in the United States
School shootings in California
Mass shootings in California
Mass shootings in the United States
High school shootings in the United States
High school shootings
Mass murder in the United States